Michele Blasco (1607–1661) was an Italian painter  and architect, active in his native Sicily, mainly painting in sacred subjects in a Baroque style.

Biography
Born in Sciacca to family originally from Spain, he was initially enrolled in religious studies locally, then in Girgenti and finally Catania. Soon his interest in art showed through and his family relented to him studying in Palermo with Pietro Novelli. In Palermo, he was influenced by the styles of Ribera and van Dyck.

Returning to Sciacca, Michele painted a San Tommaso da Villanova for the church of Santa Maria del Soccorso. He painted an Annunciation for the Chiesa del Collegio in Sciacca. He painted a St Antony Abbot for the oratory church of the Carmine. He painted a St Stephen and Martyr  for the church of Santa Margherita.

He built a new church (after 1656) to replace the Norman church with the Basilica Maria Santissima del Soccorso in Baroque style. He was buried in the church of San Francesco in Sciacca. His grandson Gaspare Testone was also a local painter.

References

1607 births
1661 deaths
People from Sciacca
Italian people of Spanish descent
17th-century Italian painters
Italian male painters
17th-century Italian architects
Painters from Sicily
Italian Baroque painters
Architects from Sicily